Erechthias is a genus of the fungus moth family, Tineidae. Therein, it belongs to the subfamily Erechthiinae, of which it is the type genus. The exact circumscription of this genus is still disputed, but it may encompass more than 150 species.

Systematics and taxonomy
Here, the genus is treated in the wide circumscription (sensu lato) adopted by many authors today, and representing the presumed core group of the Erechthiinae. Delimited thus, Erechthias includes several other genera, some of which have occasionally been treated as independent even by fairly recent authors. They are still rather similar and contain moths that are (at least overwhelmingly) very closely related. Still, they differ in details such as the wing venation – with Erechthias sensu stricto having all veins separate (as opposed to e.g. the Decadarchis group, which has hindwing veins 5 and 6 stalked) – or the clasper's harpe being nude in Erechthias s.str. but bearing a cluster of setae on the costa. However, the female genitals look almost alike in all of them.

Many of these supposedly distinct genera were always considered monotypic and are unlikely to be valid. More notable are Decadarchis (including Caryolestis, Nesoxena, Pantheus and perhaps others) and Ereunetis (including Lepidobregma and Neodecadarchis); these two are more frequently considered separate genera than other subgroups of Erechthias. The members of the former (sub)genus were in fact at first often placed in Tinea of subfamily Tineinae. Other species of Erechthias were historically assigned to Acridotarsa – also of the Tineinae (E. deloneura) – or to Mesopherna of the Myrmecozelinae (E. epomadia). E. glyphidaula has been a particular source of confusion; even veteran researcher Edward Meyrick, in some of his last works, no less than three times established a new monotypic genus for this species.

More unusually, some species of Erechthias were initially mistaken as members of the cosmet moth genus Cosmopteryx (E. cyanosticta) and the ermine moth genus Argyresthia (E. zebrina); these genera are basal Ditrysia not particularly closely related to Erechthias. The enigmatic "genus" Acrocenotes – a single species initially held to belong in the Plutellidae, which are also not close relatives of Erechthias – is also included here in the present treatment.

As another taxonomic curiosity of this genus, E. beeblebroxi is named after Douglas Adams's famous two-headed science fiction character Zaphod Beeblebrox; the moth has a "false head" pattern that presumably helps to confuse would-be predators.

Finally, the actual delimitation of Erechthias against related genera such as Comodica still needs to be determined. For example, whether the Erechthiinae Callicerastis stagmatias and Mecomodica fullawayi are justifiably separated in their monotypic genera or better included in Erechthias (as are all the other species once placed in Callicerastis) is disputed; the latter in particular seems to be somewhat intermediate between Comodica and Erechthias.

Selected species
The numerous species of Erechthias include:

 Erechthias acontistes Meyrick, 1880
 Erechthias acontotypa Turner, 1926
 Erechthias acroleuca Turner, 1923
 Erechthias aellophora Meyrick, 1880
 Erechthias ancistrosema Turner, 1939
 Erechthias ascensionae
 Erechthias articulosa Meyrick, 1921
 Erechthias aspera (J.F.G.Clarke, 1986)
 Erechthias beeblebroxi Robinson & Nielsen, 1993
 Erechthias capnitis (Turner, 1918) (type of Empaesta)
 Erechthias celestra (J.F.G.Clarke, 1986)
 Erechthias celetica Turner, 1923
 Erechthias centroscia (Turner, 1933) (type of Gongylodes)
 Erechthias charadrota Meyrick, 1880
 Erechthias chasmatias (Meyrick, 1880) (type of Hectacma)
 Erechthias chionodira
 Erechthias cirrhogramma (J.F.G.Clarke, 1971)
 Erechthias citrinopa (Lower, 1905) (sometimes in Comodica)
 Erechthias clistopa (Meyrick, 1929)
 Erechthias contributa (Meyrick, 1932) (sometimes in Comodica)
 Erechthias coleosema  (Meyrick, 1934)
 Erechthias cyanosticta (Lower, 1916)
 Erechthias darwini
 Erechthias decaspila (Lower, 1905) (sometimes in Comodica)
 Erechthias deloneura (Turner, 1923)
 Erechthias diacrita (Turner, 1923)
 Erechthias diaphora
 Erechthias dochmogramma (Lower, 1916) (sometimes in Comodica)
 Erechthias dracaenura
 Erechthias elaeorrhoa Meyrick, 1880
 Erechthias epispora (Lower, 1905) (sometimes in Comodica)
 Erechthias epomadia (Turner, 1923)
 Erechthias erebocosma (Meyrick, 1893)
 Erechthias eurynipha (Turner, 1923) (sometimes in Comodica)
 Erechthias flavistriata – sugarcane bud moth (type of Neodecadarchis)
 Erechthias glyphidaula (Meyrick, 1933) (type of Amphisyncentris)
 Erechthias grayi
 Erechthias incongrua (J.F.G.Clarke, 1986)
 Erechthias iseres (Turner, 1917)
 Erechthias iuloptera (Meyrick, 1880) (type of Ereunetis)
 Erechthias kerri
 Erechthias lychnopa Meyrick, 1927
 Erechthias minuscula – erechthias clothes moth (type of Lepidobregma)
 Erechthias molynta
 Erechthias mucronata (Meyrick, 1921) (type of Zanclopseustis)
 Erechthias mystacinella – curve-winged apple moth
 Erechthias niphadopla Meyrick, 1880
 Erechthias niphoplaca (Turner, 1923)
 Erechthias orchestris (Turner, 1932)
 Erechthias oxymacha (Meyrick, 1893)
 Erechthias oxytona (Meyrick, 1893)
 Erechthias penicillata (type of Pantheus)
 Erechthias percnomicta (Meyrick, 1934)
 Erechthias phileris (Meyrick, 1893)
 Erechthias photophanes (Meyrick, 1917)
 Erechthias physocapna (Meyrick, 1929)
 Erechthias polionota Turner, 1923
 Erechthias polyplecta Turner, 1923
 Erechthias praedatrix (Meyrick, 1934) (type of Caryolestis)
 Erechthias psammaula (Meyrick, 1921)
 Erechthias rufimacula (Meyrick, 1934)
 Erechthias saitoi (Moriuti & Kadohara, 1994) (sometimes in Comodica)
 Erechthias scythromorpha (Turner, 1926)
 Erechthias sphenotoma (Meyrick, 1935) (type of Aeolarchis)
 Erechthias simulans (type of Decadarchis)
 Erechthias sinapifera (Turner, 1926)
 Erechthias strangulata (Meyrick, 1929) (type of Nesoxena)
 Erechthias symmacha (Meyrick, 1893)
 Erechthias trigonosema (Turner, 1923)
 Erechthias tritogramma (J.F.G.Clarke, 1986)
 Erechthias zebrina (type of Tinexotaxa)

Synonyms
Times and again, groups of these moths have been proposed for separation in distinct genera. These junior synonyms of Erechthias, in the circumscription used here, are:

 Acrocenotes A.N.Diakonoff, 1968
 Aeolarchis Meyrick, 1935
 Amphisyncentris Meyrick, 1933
 Anemerarcha Meyrick, 1937
 Caryolestis Meyrick, 1934
 Decadarchis Meyrick, 1886
 Empaesta Bradley, 1956
 Ereunetis Meyrick, 1880
 Gongylodes A.J.Turner, 1933
 Hectacma Meyrick, 1915
 Lepidobregma Zimmerman, 1978
 Neodecadarchis Zimmerman, 1978
 Nesoxena Meyrick, 1929
 Pantheus Zimmerman, 1978
 Tinexotaxa Gozmany, 1968
 Triadogona Meyrick, 1937
 Zanclopseustis Meyrick, 1921

Footnotes

References

  (2010): Australian Faunal Directory – Erechthias. Version of 2010-NOV-15. Retrieved 2011-DEC-23.
  (1986): Pyralidae and Microlepidoptera of the Marquesas Archipelago. Smithsonian Contributions to Zoology 416: 1-485. PDF fulltext (214 MB!)
  (2004): Butterflies and Moths of the World, Generic Names and their Type-species – Erechthias. Version of 2004-NOV-05. Retrieved 2011-DEC-23.
  [2011]: Global Taxonomic Database of Tineidae (Lepidoptera). Retrieved 2011-DEC-23.

Moth genera
Erechthiinae
Taxa named by Edward Meyrick